Truckfighters are a Swedish rock band from Örebro, formed in 2001.

History 
Truckfighters was formed in Örebro, Sweden in 2001. After releasing EPs in 2001 and 2002, they recorded a split-EP with local Swedish band Firestone in 2003. In 2005 they released their debut album Gravity X on both Fuzzorama Records and MeteorCity Records. Their follow-up album, Phi, was released in 2007 by Poison Tree Records in the U.S. and on the Fuzzorama label elsewhere. Their sound has been described as classic desert rock, similar to bands like Dozer, Fu Manchu, and Kyuss. They have been featured on the MTV Sweden show "Fuzz". The band has done extensive touring over the years, playing more than 300 live shows, most of them in Europe. Their first USA tour, in July 2011, included stops in New York, Chicago, Detroit, and Cleveland.

The film Truckfighters (Fuzzomentary) by Joerg Steineck and Christian Maciejewski portrays the band's life.
It was released in December 2011 and features interviews with Josh Homme of Queens of the Stone Age. The film provides an ironic, entertaining view of the three "ordinary" guys who transform into Fuzz Monsters onstage.

Their album Universe was released on February 24, 2014. As a teaser, The Chairman EP was released in October 2013.

The band's most recent studio album, V, was released on September 30, 2016. It marks a significant change in style for the trio, as they intermingle their trademark heavy stoner rock sound with lengthy atmospheric sections.

On February 21, 2018, the band announced on their Facebook page that they are going on a "long, long hiatus" and "Might come back stronger than ever (that's the only way) or not at all!"

On March 4, 2019, the band was announced to reconvene to play an exclusive set at Psycho Las Vegas 2019, and took the Pool stage on Aug 28th as a part of a reunion tour.

During the second half of 2019 and early 2020 the band toured the album Gravity X in its entity from finish to start.

Members

Current line up
 Ozo (Oskar Cedermalm) - vocals and bass
 Dango (Niklas Källgren) - guitar
 Toro (Johan Marberg) - drums (Session)

Former members
 Pezo (Oscar Johansson) - drums (in the band (2001-2003) (2008-2009) (2011-2012) (2017))
 El Danno (Daniel Israelsson) - drums (2016)
 Enzo (Axel Larsson) - drums (2015)
 Poncho (Andre Kvarnström) - drums (2013-2014)(Now in Blues Pills)
 Frongo (Fredrik Larsson) - drums (2010–2011)(Now in GRID)
 Pedro (Pär Hjulström) - drums (2009–2010)
 Fredo (Winfred Kennerknecht) - guitar  (left the band in 2008)
 Paco (Andreas von Ahn) - drums (left the band in 2008 due to wrist injury)

Session musicians

 Franco (Fredrik Nilsson) - guitar stand-in one European tour 2006
 Mckenzo (Danne Mckenzie) - drums (September–December 2012)
 Lobo (Aaron Michael Boyer) - session drummer shows in Jan-March 2017
 Taco (Robert Wiiand) - session drummer shows summer and fall 2016 - spring 2017
 Maco (Marcus Johansson) - session drummer shows fall 2016

Discography

Studio albums

EPs and singles

Compilation appearances
 "Analougus" on The Ultimate Fuzzcollection Volume One CD (2004 Fuzzorama Records)
 "Freewheelin'" on Road to Nowhere CD (2007 Poison Tree Records)
 "In Search Of (The)" on ...And Back to Earth Again: Ten Years of MeteorCity CD (2007 MeteorCity Records)

References

External links
 
 Truckfighters film
 Truckfighters at Myspace
 List of magazine and website reviews of Gravity X
 MeteorCity

Swedish heavy metal musical groups
Swedish stoner rock musical groups